The Feusier Octagon House is an historic octagonal house built in c. 1857, and located in the Russian Hill neighborhood of San Francisco, California. 

It has been listed as a San Francisco Designated Landmark since October 1, 1970; listed as a California Historical Landmark since March 24, 1974; and it has been added to the National Register of Historic Places since March 24, 1974. The house is also part of the Russian Hill-Paris Block Architectural District.

History 
The Feusier Octagon House is located at 1067 Green Street in San Francisco. It was built between 1857 and 1858 by George Kenny, who sold it in 1870 to Louis Feusier. The house was later expanded with a third story, mansard roof, and cupola.

The Feusier Octagon House, McElroy Octagon House, and the Marine Exchange Lookout Station at Land's End are the only three remaining octagon houses in the city. 

 it is a rental house, before being put up for sale in 2021 for US$8.6 million.

See also
 McElroy Octagon House
 List of San Francisco Designated Landmarks

References

Houses in San Francisco
Octagon houses in California
Russian Hill, San Francisco
National Register of Historic Places in San Francisco
San Francisco Designated Landmarks
1857 establishments in California
1850s architecture in the United States
Victorian architecture in California

California Historical Landmarks
Houses on the National Register of Historic Places in San Francisco